The 2019 Tulsa Golden Hurricane football team represented the University of Tulsa in the 2019 NCAA Division I FBS football season. The Golden Hurricane played their home games at Skelly Field at H. A. Chapman Stadium in Tulsa, Oklahoma, and competed in the West Division of the American Athletic Conference. They were led by fifth-year head coach Philip Montgomery. They finished the season 4–8, 2–6 in AAC play to finish in a tie for fifth-place in the West Division.

Previous season
The Golden Hurricane finished the 2018 season 3–9, 2–6 in AAC play to finish in a tie for fifth place in the West Division.

Preseason

AAC media poll
The AAC media poll was released on July 16, 2019, with the Golden Hurricane predicted to finish sixth in the AAC West Division.

Schedule

Game summaries

at Michigan State

at San Jose State

Oklahoma State

Wyoming

at SMU

Navy

at Cincinnati

Memphis

at Tulane

UCF

Houston

at East Carolina

Roster

Players drafted into the NFL

References

Tulsa
Tulsa Golden Hurricane football seasons
Tulsa Golden Hurricane football